Tunde Eso  (born 16 August 1977) is a Nigerian journalist, social commentator, public relations specialist and publisher of Findout Newspaper. He is a 2018 PDP aspirant for Governor of Osun State. Eso is the founder of Youthocracy; a new system of government, president of Fix Nigeria Group and the author of the books African Security Solution and Vision for Africa.

Early life and education 
Eso was born and raised in Ilesha, Osun State, to the family of Pa Obafemi and Iyabode Eso (née Fanibe) on 16 August 1977. He studied accountancy for his National Diploma certificate at Osun State College of Technology, Esa-Oke, in 2005. He obtained his bachelor of science degree in Political Science at University of Education, Winneba, Ghana.

Political views 
In an interview with the Nigerian Guardian newspaper, Eso said the old generation of politicians would continue to sideline Nigerian youth until the youths realize that they constitute the most significant number of voters. He opined that the numerical strength of the children is enough to pick and select one of the young Nigerians with pragmatic programmes. In Eso's opinion, Nigerian youths have been neglected by past administrations. He also believes that it is time to build leaders with the right thoughts and actions, leaders who will not fight for their pockets only, leaders who will think of others and not themselves alone. In his opinion, the integration of young people in politics is needed to solve Nigeria's insecurity problems.

Youthocracy 
In 2013, Eso coined a new system of government called Youthocracy which he defined as 'Government of the people, by the youth and for the people' in his book titled Vision for Africa; he further explain that his motives is to provide political opportunities to youths so they can be relevant in Nigerian politics, hence the need to identify with Youthocracy which is set to takeover from Democracy according to his interview with The Nation.

References

External links 

Living people
1977 births
People from Osun State
Nigerian politicians
Nigerian journalists
Yoruba politicians
Yoruba businesspeople
University of Education, Winneba alumni